Özcan Alper (born 1975) is a Turkish film director and screenwriter of Hemshin descent.

He studied at Trabzon Lisesi. In 1992, he moved to Istanbul to study at Istanbul University Engineering Faculty in the Physics Department and then moved to Istanbul University Literature Faculty where he studied History of Sciences and graduated in 2003.

Since 1996, he was interested in films and took part in workshops organized by Mezopotamya Culture Center, the Nâzım Culture House (now renamed Nâzım Hikmet Culture Center). Starting 2000 started assisting in films under the supervision of film director Yeşim Ustaoğlu.

After being assistant director in the short Toprak, he filmed Momi as his first short film as main director. He also shot the documentary Tokai City'de Melankoli ve Rapsodi in Japan following it with yet another documentary entitled Bir Bilimadamıyla Zaman Enleminde Yolculuk.

In 2008, Alper released his first long feature Sonbahar (Autumn in Turkish) with multiple awards as a newcomer. He followed that with another critically acclaimed film Gelecek Uzun Sürer (English title Future Lasts Forever) that has also won important awards.

Filmography

Director
2006: Saklı Yüzler (as assistant director)
2007: Sonbahar (director), English title Autumn
2011: Gelecek Uzun Sürer, English title Future Lasts Forever
2015: Rüzgarın Hatıraları, English title Memories Of The Wind

Screenwriter
2007: Sonbahar (director), English title Autumn
2010: Kars Öyküleri
2011: Gelecek Uzun Sürer, English title Future Lasts Forever
2015: Rüzgarın Hatıraları, English title Memories Of The Wind

Shorts
1999: Toprak as assistant director (short film)
2001: Momi, director (short film)

Documentaries
Tokai City'de Melankoli ve Rapsodi
Bir Bilimadamıyla Zaman Enleminde Yolculuk

Actor
2011: Fotoğraf

Awards
For Sonbahar (Autumn)
2008: Won "Best Film" and "Jury Award" at the 15th Adana Altın Koza Film Festivali, Turkey
2008: Won NETPAC Award at the Avrasya International Film Festivali
2008: Won "C.I.C.A.E. Award" at Locarno International Film Festival
2008: Won "Silver Prometheus" at the Tbilisi International Film Festival
2009: Won "Best film" at the Ankara International Film Festival
2009: Won "Best director" at the Ankara International Film Festival
2009: Won "Best director" at the Sofia International Film Festival
2009: Won "FIPRESCI Prize" at the Yerevan International Film Festival
2009: Won "Jury Special Prize" for Best Film at the Yerevan International Film Festival
2009: Won "Best First Film" at the 2nd Yeşilçam Awards
2009: Nominated for "European Discovery of the Year" at the European Film Awards
2022: Received the Directors award from the Bogazici Film Festival, he dedicated the prize to Sebnem Korur Fincanci, the president of the Turkish Medical Association.
For Gelecek Uzun Sürer (Future Lasts Forever)
At the Adana Altın Koza Film Festival
Best Director
Best Actor
Yılmaz Güney Award
At the Malatya International Film Festival
Best Film
Best Director
Best Musik
At Kerala International Film Festival
"FIPRESCI Best Film Award"

References

External links
Nar Film Official website

Özcan Alper at the SinemaTurk.com

Turkish film directors
1975 births
Living people
Istanbul University alumni
Turkish people of Hemshin descent